A Janus kinase inhibitor, also known as JAK inhibitor or jakinib, is a type of immune modulating medication, which inhibits the activity of one or more of the Janus kinase family of enzymes (JAK1, JAK2, JAK3, TYK2), thereby interfering with the JAK-STAT signaling pathway in lymphocytes.

It is used in the treatment of cancer and inflammatory diseases such as rheumatoid arthritis and various skin conditions.A  Janus kinase 3 inhibitor is attractive as a possible treatment of various autoimmune diseases since its function is mainly restricted to lymphocytes. As of 2017, development of a selective JAK3 inhibitor was ongoing.

Contraindications 
The US Food and Drug Administration (FDA) requires the boxed warning for tofacitinib, baricitinib, and upadacitinib to include information about the risks of serious heart-related events, cancer, blood clots, and death.

The Pharmacovigilance Risk Assessment Committee of the European Medicines Agency (EMA) recommends that the Janus kinase inhibitors abrocitinib, filgotinib, baricitinib, upadacitinib, and tofacitinib should be used in the following people only if no suitable alternative treatments are available: those aged 65 years or above, those at increased risk of major cardiovascular problems (such as heart attack or stroke), those who smoke or have done so for a long time in the past and those at increased risk of cancer. The committee also recommends using JAK inhibitors with caution in people with risk factors for blood clots in the lungs and in deep veins (venous thromboembolism (VTE)) other than those listed above.

The special warnings by FDA and EMA are important for shared-decision making with the patient.

Mechanism of action 
Janus kinase inhibitors can be classed in several overlapping classes: they are immunomodulators, they are DMARDs (disease-modifying antirheumatic drugs), and they are a subclass of tyrosine kinase inhibitors. They work by modifying the immune system via cytokine activity inhibition.

Cytokines play key roles in controlling cell growth and the immune response.  Many cytokines function by binding to and activating type I cytokine receptors and type II cytokine receptors. These receptors in turn rely on the Janus kinase (JAK) family of enzymes for signal transduction.  Hence drugs that inhibit the activity of these Janus kinases block cytokine signalling.

More specifically, Janus kinases phosphorylate activated cytokine receptors.  These phosphorylated receptors in turn recruit STAT transcription factors which modulate gene transcription.

The first JAK inhibitor to reach clinical trials was tofacitinib. Tofacitinib is a specific inhibitor of JAK3 (IC50 = 2 nM) thereby blocking the activity of IL-2, IL-4, IL-15 and IL-21. Hence Th2 cell differentiation is blocked and therefore tofacitinib is effective in treating allergic diseases. Tofacitinib to a lesser extent also inhibits JAK1 (IC50 = 100 nM) and JAK2 (IC50 = 20 nM), which in turn blocks IFN-γ and IL-6 signalling and consequently Th1 cell differentiation.

One mechanism (relevant to psoriasis) is that the blocking of Jak-dependent IL-23 reduces IL-17 and the damage it causes.

Molecule design 

Some JAK1 inhibitors are based on a benzimidazole core.

JAK3 inhibitors target the catalytic ATP-binding site of JAK3 and various moieties have been used to get a stronger affinity and selectivity to the ATP-binding pockets. The base that is often seen in compounds with selectivity for JAK3 is pyrrolopyrimidine, as it binds to the same region of the JAKs as purine of the ATP binds. Another ring system that has been used in JAK3 inhibitor derivatives is 1H-pyrrolo[2,3-b]pyridine, as it mimics the pyrrolopyrimidine scaffold. More information on the structure activity relationship of may be found in the article on JAK3 inhibitors.

Examples

Approved compounds

In clinical trials 
 Cerdulatinib (PRT062070) dual SYK/JAK inhibitor for hematological malignancies.
 Gandotinib (LY-2784544) against JAK2 for myeloproliferative neoplasms.
 Lestaurtinib (CEP-701) against JAK2 for acute myeloid leukemia (AML).
 Momelotinib (GS-0387, CYT-387) against JAK1 and JAK2 for myeloproliferative disorders and relapsed/refractory metastatic pancreatic cancer.
 Pacritinib (SB1518) for relapsed lymphoma and advanced myeloid malignancies, also myelofibrosis, myeloproliferative neoplasms and myelodysplastic syndrome.
 Deucravacitinib is currently in clinical trials for psoriatic arthritis, inflammatory bowel disease and systemic lupus erythematosus.

Experimental drugs/indications 
 Cucurbitacin I (JSI-124).
 CHZ868 — a type II JAK2 inhibitor for use in myeloproliferative disorders and chronic myelomonocytic leukemia (CMML).
 Tofacitinib for alopecia universalis.
 Topical tofacitinib and ruxolitinib for alopecia.

References

External links 

Non-receptor tyrosine kinase inhibitors